Sébastian Jacot is a Swiss flutist. He is one of the principal flutists of the Berlin Philharmonic Orchestra.

Early life
Jacot began playing flute at age 8. He studied under Isabelle Giraud and Jacques Zoon, graduating from the Conservatoire de musique de Genève in 2010.

Career
At age 18, Jacot was appointed assistant principal flute of the Hong Kong Philharmonic Orchestra under Edo de Waart. He held this position for two years, subsequently playing with the Mozart Orchestra under Claudio Abbado, the Mahler Chamber Orchestra, the Munich Chamber Orchestra, and the Saito Kinen Orchestra. He was a jury member at the 2021 Cluj International Music Competition.

In May 2022, Jacot won the position of principal flute with the Berlin Philharmonic Orchestra, replacing Mathieu Dufour. Jacot was previously with the Leipzig Gewandhaus Orchestra.

Awards
Jacot won the first-place prize at the 2013 Kobe International Flute Competition, the first-place prize and "Best Interpretation of a Contemporary Creation" at the 2014 Carl Nielsen International Flute Competition, and the first-place prize at the 2015 ARD International Music Competition.

Jacot plays one of three cocus wooden Haynes made in 1999, a 14k custom-made golden Parmenon, and a silver Miyasawa.

References

Living people
1987 births
Players of the Berlin Philharmonic
Swiss classical flautists
Musicians from Geneva